Turn the Lights On (also known under the acronym TTLO) is the debut studio album by American record producer, songwriter, singer and rapper Rico Love. It was released on May 18, 2015, by Interscope. The production on the album was handled primarily by Love, Danja, Jim Jonson, Jack Splash, DJ Dahi and his own orchestra, TTLO.

Background
Starting his career as a rapper signed to Usher's short-lived record label US Records, he began recording a studio album, which was later shelved. Love, being a successful songwriter and producer is stepping to the forefront as an artist. Love got his start in the writing songs like “Throwback” and “Seduction” on Usher's 2004 Grammy Award-winning album, Confessions. Love continued success features Usher's "There Goes My Baby", "Hey Daddy (Daddy's Home)" and "Dive", Nelly's "Just a Dream" and "Gone", Beyoncé's "Sweet Dreams", and Kelly Rowland's "Motivation".

Track listing 
Credits adapted from the album's liner notes.

Notes
  signifies an additional producer.
 "TTLO" features additional vocals from Waka Flocka Flame
 "Bad Attitude" features additional vocals from Raekwon, Armani Caesar and Dyrana Mcintosh
 "Somebody Else" features additional vocals from Tiara Thomas and Ginette Claudette
 "Happy Birthday" features additional vocals from Salome Berrebi

Sample credits
 "Bad Attitude" contains excerpts from "Stop and Look (And You Have Found Love)", written by Adrian Younge and William Hart and performed by The Delfonics
 "The Affair" contains excerpts from "Onward", written by Alfred Darlington and Amir Yaghmai and performed by Daedelus
 "Somebody Else" contains portions of "Brother", written by Matt Corby

Credits and personnel
Primary Artist - Rico Love
Executive Producer - Rico Love
Production -  Jim Jonsin, Rico Love, Danja, DJ Dahi, Benny Blanco
Composers – Adrian Younge, Alfred Darlington, Amir Yaghmai, Armani Caesar, Benjamin Levin, Corey Woods, Dacoity Natche, Dan Omelio, Diego Ave, Dwayne Nesmith, Earl Hood, Eric Goudy II, Flloyd Nataniel Hills, Isaac de Boni, Jack Splash Jacob Dutton, James Scheffer, Marceilia Araica, Matt Corby, Michael Mule, Nokolas Marzouca, Rico Love, Thurston McCrea, Tiago Carvalho, William Hurt.
Featured Artist - Raekwon, Armani Caesar 
A&R - Shawn Suggs, Alicia Caesar

Source

References

2015 debut albums